Alexandre Mauguin (30 January 1838 – 4 March 1916) was a French printer who was deputy and then senator of the department of Algiers in French Algeria between 1881 and 1894.

Early years (1838–81)

Alexandre Mauguin was born on 30 January 1838 in Allerey, Côte-d'Or.
He was related to François Mauguin (1785–1854), a Representative during the French Second Republic in 1848 and 1849.
The orator Francois Mauguin, who inspired the charter of July 1830 and was deputy of Beaune from 1827 to 1851, was his uncle.
Mauguin created the imprimerie Mauguin in Blida in 1847.
He became mayor of Blida, a member of the general council of the department of Algiers, and vice-president of the general council.

Politician (1881–94)
Mauguin ran for election as Republican candidate for the legislature on 21 August 1881 in the 2nd district of Algiers.
He was elected by 3,596 votes against 2,675 for the outgoing member François Joseph Gastu(fr).
In the house Mauguin voted with the majority, including for credits for the Tonkin Campaign.

On 25 January 1885 Mauguin was elected to the senate by 130 votes against 105 for the outgoing senator Ferdinand Lelièvre.
He sat with the Republican majority, supported government policy, and voted for reinstatement of the district poll, for the draft Lisbonne law restricting freedom of the press, and for the Senate procedure against General Boulanger.
His term ended on 6 January 1894.
Mauguin ran for reelection to the senate in 1894.
After obtaining only two votes in the first round, he withdrew from the second round. 
Paul Gérente was elected.

Alexandre Mauguin died on 4 March 1916 in Algiers, Algeria.
The printing house was passed down from father to son until it was taken over by his great-granddaughter, Chantal Lefèvre, after her return from Spain to Algeria in 1993.
As of 2014 the printing house was still producing books.

Publications
Publications by Mauguin include:

As a deputy

As a senator

Notes

Sources

1838 births
1916 deaths
People from Côte-d'Or
Politicians from Bourgogne-Franche-Comté
Opportunist Republicans
Members of the 3rd Chamber of Deputies of the French Third Republic
Senators of French Algeria
French general councillors
Mayors of places in Algeria